The Mandarin Daily News Language Center is a Chinese language school for native English speakers in Taipei, Taiwan.

The school is sponsored by the Mandarin Daily News, a major Taiwanese newspaper.  .  The school is non-accredited, but foreign students at either school are eligible for student visa extensions.

External links
Mandarin Daily News
Mandarin Daily News language Center
ROC Ministry of Education

Language schools in Taiwan
Schools in Taipei
Schools of Chinese as a second or foreign language